Pitcairnia encholirioides is a plant species in the genus Pitcairnia. This species is endemic to Brazil.

References

encholirioides
Flora of Brazil